Oier Olazábal Paredes (born 14 September 1989), known simply as Oier, is a Spanish professional footballer who plays as a goalkeeper for Cypriot First Division club Pafos FC.

Club career

Barcelona
Born in Irun, Gipuzkoa, Basque Country, Oier arrived in FC Barcelona's youth academy at the age of 18, from local Real Unión. He spent his first years with the reserves as backup to another youth product, Rubén.

Oier made his debut for the first team on 2 January 2008, in the 2–2 home draw against CD Alcoyano in the round of 32 of the Copa del Rey. More than one year after, on 17 May, he appeared for the first time in La Liga as Barça were already champions, in a 2–1 away loss to RCD Mallorca.

For the 2009–10 campaign, after Albert Jorquera left for neighbours Girona FC, Oier was promoted to third choice. He still continued to appear regularly for the B's, however.

Granada
On 11 July 2014, Oier signed a three-year deal with Granada CF for an undisclosed fee. On 25 August of the following year, he was loaned to fellow top-division side Real Sociedad in a season-long deal.

Levante
On 29 January 2017, Oier was loaned to Levante UD for the rest of the campaign with the option to buy in event of promotion; he replaced Álex Remiro, whose own temporary switch from Athletic Bilbao had been curtailed. Manager Juan Ramón López Muñiz began playing him in place of Raúl Fernández in the final matches, including in the goalless draw at CD Tenerife on 20 May that saw the Granotas crowned Segunda División champions.

Oier took the starting place from Fernández in the top flight, and signed a new deal in June 2018 to last until 2021, with a further year as an option.

Espanyol
Having only been used in cup games due to Paco López' preference for Aitor Fernández, Oier left for RCD Espanyol on 31 January 2020 for a €1.5 million fee, signing until June 2022 with the option of another season after that. Due to Diego López' suspension, he debuted on 13 June as the 70th goalkeeper in the club's history in a 2–0 home win over Deportivo Alavés.

International career
On 30 December 2016, Oier made his one appearance for the unofficial Basque Country team, playing the second half of a 3–1 win over Tunisia at the San Mamés Stadium.

Career statistics

Honours
Barcelona
La Liga: 2008–09

Levante
Segunda División: 2016–17

Espanyol
Segunda División: 2020–21

References

External links

1989 births
Living people
Sportspeople from Irun
Spanish footballers
Footballers from the Basque Country (autonomous community)
Association football goalkeepers
La Liga players
Segunda División players
Segunda División B players
Real Unión footballers
FC Barcelona Atlètic players
FC Barcelona players
Granada CF footballers
Real Sociedad footballers
Levante UD footballers
RCD Espanyol footballers
Cypriot First Division players
Pafos FC players
Spain youth international footballers
Basque Country international footballers
Spanish expatriate footballers
Expatriate footballers in Cyprus
Spanish expatriate sportspeople in Cyprus